Richard Darcy may refer to:

Richard Darcy, character in Anna und die Liebe
Richard Southwell alias Darcy, MP

See also
Richard Darcey